Livia De Clercq (born 3 June 1982) is a Belgian Paralympic athlete who competes in long jump and occasionally sprinting events at international level events. 

De Clercq had her left leg amputated above the knee after she was diagnosed with a tumour in left knee aged fourteen. She had her kneecap removed but her body rejected the prosthesis which led to amputation.

References

1982 births
Living people
Sportspeople from Ghent
People from Deinze
Paralympic athletes of Belgium
Belgian female long jumpers
Belgian female sprinters
Athletes (track and field) at the 2016 Summer Paralympics
Belgian amputees